This is a list of FM radio stations in the United States having call signs beginning with the letters KN through KP. Low-power FM radio stations, those with designations such as KNAK-LP, have not been included in this list.

KN--

KO--

KP--

See also
 North American call sign

FM radio stations in the United States by call sign (initial letters KN-KP)